Uttargaya is a Rural municipality located within the Rasuwa District of the Bagmati Province of Nepal.
The municipality spans  of area, with a total population of 8255 according to a 2011 Nepal census.

On March 10, 2017, the Government of Nepal restructured the local level bodies into 753 new local level structures.
The previous Thulogaun, Dandagaun and portion of Haku and Laharepauwa VDCs were merged to form Uttargaya Rural Municipality.
Uttargaya is divided into 5 wards, with Laharepauwa declared the administrative center of the rural municipality.

References

External links
official website of the rural municipality

Rural municipalities in Rasuwa District
Rural municipalities of Nepal established in 2017